Out to Win is a 2015 American documentary film, directed by Malcolm Ingram. The film chronicles the history of LGBT participation in professional sports, concentrating in particular on key figures such as John Amaechi, Billy Bean, Jason Collins, Wade Davis, Brittney Griner, Billie Jean King, David Kopay, Conner Mertens, Martina Navratilova, and Michael Sam.

The film had its premiere on March 15, 2015 at SXSW.

See also
List of lesbian, gay, bisexual or transgender-related films of 2015

References

External links

2015 films
American LGBT-related films
American sports documentary films
2015 LGBT-related films
Documentary films about LGBT sportspeople
2010s English-language films
Films directed by Malcolm Ingram
2010s American films